The Academic are an Irish indie rock band, formed in Rochfortbridge, County Westmeath in 2013. The band consists of Craig Fitzgerald, Dean Gavin, and brothers Matthew and Stephen Murtagh.

Their debut studio album, Tales from the Backseat, was released in January 2018, entering the Irish Albums Chart at number one. The album was nominated for Album of the Year at the Choice Music Prize in January 2019. Their second studio album, Sitting Pretty, was released on 10 February 2023.

History

Formation and early years (2013–2016) 
The Academic were formed in 2013, when Fitzgerald, Gavin and the Murtagh brothers were attending St Joseph's Secondary School, Rochfortbridge. 

Such was the reaction to the release of their debut EP, Loose Friends, in October 2015, that the band sold out their first show at Dublin venue Vicar Street. 

In January 2016, the band were selected by RTÉ 2FM to represent Ireland at Eurosonic Noorderslag in Groningen, which resulted in numerous festival bookings and extensive radio airplay across Europe that year.

Tales from the Backseat (2017–2019) 
The band garnered further media interest in July 2017 with the release of "Bear Claws", an anthemic track which was likened in style to The Strokes. The track received further attention after the premiere of their first-of-a-kind live looper music video. The video, which was performed live on a Facebook video stream, utilized the delay in the stream to create a musical loop, to which they gradually added vocals and instruments. It was a viral hit and reached over 1 million views on YouTube in 48 hours. 

The band announced on 26 October 2017 that their debut LP, Tales from the Backseat, would be released on 12 January 2018. The album was released to critical acclaim, entering the Irish Albums Chart at number one.

Their biggest headline show to date took place at the Iveagh Gardens, Dublin, on 20 July 2018, before they embarked upon a US, European, UK and Ireland tour for the autumn of 2018.

The album was nominated for Album of the Year at the Choice Music Prize in January 2019.

Signing to Capitol and Sitting Pretty (2020–present) 
The band signed to Capitol Records in May 2020. They released their second album, Sitting Pretty, on 10 February 2023. It debuted atop the Irish Albums Chart on 17 February 2023 and went in at number 198 in the United Kingdom with a total of 1,023 sales in that territory.

Members 
 Craig Fitzgerald – lead vocals, guitar
 Matthew Murtagh – guitar, backing vocals
 Stephen Murtagh – bass, backing vocals
 Dean Gavin – drums, backing vocals

Discography

Albums

Extended plays

Singles

References

External links 
 

Mullingar
Irish indie rock groups
2013 establishments in Ireland
Musical groups established in 2013
Musical groups from County Westmeath
Downtown Records artists